Josephine Margaret Warne (2 January 1938 – 13 January 2017), better known as Jo Warne, was an English actress, who briefly played Peggy Mitchell in the BBC soap opera EastEnders, making her first appearance on 30 April 1991. She appeared in a total of ten EastEnders episodes between April and July 1991, as part of Sam and Ricky's teen elopement storyline. Barbara Windsor later took on the full-time role of Peggy Mitchell until 2016.

Warne appeared in the last episode of the 1970s police series, The Sweeney, as Gloria Bartley, Jack Regan's ex-girlfriend. She also appeared in an episode of the drama Minder (1980), ITV's Hammer House of Horror in the episode The House That Bled to Death, episode 8 of The Bill, made several appearances in various series of T-Bag during the 1980s – early 1990s, and appeared in Series 8 of Bodger and Badger as Mrs Bobbins. Between 1991 and 1996 she played Julie Corrigan's mother in Grange Hill and in 1997 took small roles in episodes of Where the Heart Is and Chalk. Her film credits included roles in Nutcracker (1982), Little Dorrit (1987) and Consuming Passions (1988). Warne died in January 2017 on the Isle of Wight.

References

External links
 

British television actresses
British soap opera actresses
1938 births
2017 deaths